Guaimaca Fútbol Club is a Honduran football club based in Guaimaca, Honduras.

References 

Football clubs in Honduras